KLML, virtual channel 20 (VHF digital channel 7), is a Court TV-affiliated television station licensed to Grand Junction, Colorado, United States, and serving Colorado's Western Slope region. The station is owned by Fresno, California–based Ventura Broadcasting. KLML's transmitter is located at the Mesa Point Electronics Site on the Grand Mesa (southeast of I-70).

History
KLML signed on the air on October 22, 1979 as KJCT, the first television station in Western Colorado since KREX-TV in 1954. It was owned by the Pikes Peak Broadcasting Company as a semi-satellite of fellow ABC affiliate KRDO-TV in Colorado Springs. Before channel 8's sign-on, all three major networks had been shoehorned onto KREX-TV. However, cable viewers could watch the full ABC schedule via Denver's KBTV (channel 9, now KUSA).

The station had full production facilities in Grand Junction; however, much of the programming was fed via hundreds of miles of microwave links from KRDO. In the late 1990s, KJCT chief engineer Roger Hightower modernized KJCT into one of the first true digital facilities in Colorado, and severed the electronic umbilical cord with KRDO.

KJCT was the first Western Colorado television station with modern electronic news gathering technology. "8 Live," the stations' first live microwave newsvan, came into service in 1984.

In 2006, News-Press & Gazette Company announced the purchase of KJCT along with KRDO-TV and KRDO radio from Pikes Peak Broadcasting.

As of January 2007, KJCT added a new second subchannel carrying Telemundo programming. In late 2008, KJCT's third digital subcarrier became western Colorado's affiliate for The CW. However, despite The CW being available locally, Denver's KWGN-TV, which has been on cable for decades in Grand Junction, is still available through two low-powered repeaters in the area.

On August 2, 2013, News Press & Gazette announced the sale of KJCT's license assets to Excalibur Broadcasting and its non-license assets to Gray Television; Excalibur is owned by former Gray executive, Don Ray. Gray planned to operate the station through joint sales and shared services agreements, making KJCT a sister station to KKCO. The sale was completed on October 31. This was NPG's first broadcast divestiture since the sale of its original group of five stations to New Vision Television in 1993.

In the wake of the FCC's increased scrutiny towards virtual duopolies, Gray announced that it would move KJCT's programming to a subchannel of KKCO, and sell KJCT to a minority owned broadcaster, which would operate the station autonomously from KJCT or any other broadcaster. On August 27, 2014, Gray announced that it would sell KJCT to Jeff Chang and Gabriela Gomez-Chang, owner of KQSL. On October 28, 2014, the call sign became KGBY; this change was temporary and was reverted to KJCT in November 19, 2014, with the permanent change to KGBY slated to occur upon the completion of the sale. A week earlier, on October 21, the FCC approved a swap of virtual channels between KJCT/KGBY and a co-owned low-power station in Grand Junction, KKHD-LP (channel 20), that Gray simultaneously acquired; as a result, KGBY uses PSIP to map to virtual channel 20, while KKHD inherited virtual channel 8, as well as KJCT's ABC programming. The swap was intended to reduce viewer confusion that would otherwise result from a move of ABC programming. The sale was completed on December 15, at which point the KGBY call sign returned. Gray subsequently changed KKHD's call letters to KJCT-LP.

On November 3, 2020, the station changed its callsign to KLML. Earlier that year, the station switched to Court TV, moving Cozi TV to the fourth subchannel. The KGBY-LD call sign was then placed by Chang on the construction permit formerly known as K10QV-D at Palm Springs, California, which he had purchased earlier in the year.

News operation
On May 22, 2009, KJCT became the first station in Grand Junction to launch local news in high definition. The station debuted a new set in May 2011, to coincide with a new graphics package. In July 2011, KJCT overtook its competitors to become the top rated station in the coveted 25–54 demographic in all weekday newscasts.

Notable former on-air staff
 John Gurtler – sports anchor (now serves as the play-by-play voice of the Buffalo Bandits)
 Michelle Tuzee – anchor/reporter (later with KABC-TV in Los Angeles)

Technical information

Subchannels
The station's digital signal is multiplexed:

Translator

References

External links

Court TV affiliates
Dabl affiliates
Defy TV affiliates
Cozi TV affiliates
TrueReal affiliates
True Crime Network affiliates
Scripps News affiliates
Quest (American TV network) affiliates
Buzzr affiliates
Television channels and stations established in 1979
LML
1979 establishments in Colorado